Ustaoset Station is a railway station located at Ustaoset in Hol, Norway. The station is served by up to seven daily express trains operated by Vy Tog. The station was opened in 1912 when cabin building started in the area. Ustaoset is primarily a recreational area, with 900 cabins.

References

Other sources
Nils Carl Aspenberg (1999)  Fra Roa til Bergen. Historien om Bergensbanen (Oslo: Baneforlaget)

External links
 Jernbaneverket's page on Ustaoset

Railway stations in Buskerud
Railway stations on Bergensbanen
Railway stations opened in 1907